Frank T. Gilmore (April 27, 1864 in Webster, Massachusetts – July 21, 1929 in Hartford, Connecticut) was a professional baseball player who played pitcher in the Major Leagues from -. He would play for the Washington Nationals.

External links

1864 births
1929 deaths
Major League Baseball pitchers
Washington Nationals (1886–1889) players
19th-century baseball players
Newark Domestics players
Hartford Babies players
Hartford Dark Blues (minor league) players
Syracuse Stars (minor league baseball) players
Newark Little Giants players
Canandaigua (minor league baseball) players
Buffalo Bisons (minor league) players
Wilmington Blue Hens players
Baseball players from Massachusetts
People from Webster, Massachusetts
Sportspeople from Worcester County, Massachusetts